Presidential elections were held in Brazil on 3 October 1960. Jânio Quadros of the National Labor Party, helming a coalition of the PTN, the National Democratic Union and the Christian Democratic Party, won a sweeping victory, taking 48.3% of the vote. Voter turnout was 81%.

Quadros' victory was the largest in Brazilian history at the time; the 15.6 percent margin of victory would remain a record until Fernando Henrique Cardoso won by 27 points in 1994. When Quadros took office on 31 January 1961, it marked the first time since Brazil had become a republic in 1889 that an incumbent government peacefully transferred power to an elected member of the opposition. It also marked the first time in 31 years that the presidency had not been won by an heir to the legacy of Getúlio Vargas.

This would be the last free and direct presidential election held in Brazil until 1989.

Results

President

Vice President

References

Presidential elections in Brazil
Brazil
President
President